Nico Hiraga (born December 19, 1997) is an American skateboarder and actor. He is known for playing Seth in the 2021 film Moxie and Tanner in the 2019 film Booksmart. Hiraga's roles also include Summer of 17, Skate Kitchen, Ballers, and North Hollywood. Hiraga is in the Amazon series The Power and the 2022 film Hello, Goodbye, and Everything In Between.

Filmography

Films

Television

References

External links

 

Living people
1997 births
American male film actors
American skateboarders